Hokonui is a town in the Southland region of the South Island of New Zealand. The 2013 census recorded the town's population as 3,087.

References

Populated places in Southland, New Zealand